Central Penn College (Central Penn or CPC) is a private for-profit college in Summerdale, Pennsylvania. Established in 1881, CPC offers associate degrees, bachelor's degrees, and a master's degree in Professional Studies. In 2004, Central Penn College opened a Lancaster, Pennsylvania location and began offering blended and online classes. The college is accredited by the Middle States Commission on Higher Education. Central Penn College was originally known as Central Pennsylvania Business School. The school changed its name in 1999 to Central Pennsylvania College and then to Central Penn College in 2010.

History

Central Penn College was founded in 1881 under the name "Pennsylvania Business College". Its original location was on Market Street in Harrisburg. In 1970 the new president Bart Milano moved the Central Pennsylvania Business School, as it was known at that time, across the river to Summerdale where it continues to operate today.

In 2015 Central Penn added three health science degree programs: Bachelor of Science in Health Science, Bachelor of Science in Healthcare Management and Bachelor of Science in Radiology Sciences. Classes are offered in the traditional on-campus format, virtual on-line format, and a blended format.

Presidential history 
 1881–1886 – Joseph N. Curre
 1886–1917 – John E. Garner
 1917–1922 – Dwight L. M. Raker
 1922–1935 – William H. Hartsock
 1935–1953 – Sadie T. Hartsock
 1953–1969 – H. Rae Young
 1969–1989 – Bart A. Milano
 1989–2012 – Todd A. Milano
 2013–2017 – Dr. Karen M. Scolforo
 2018–Present – Dr. Linda Fedrizzi-Williams

Campus
The landscape of the campus has changed over the years. In 2002 the Advanced Technology Education Center opened. The new building doubled the number of academic classrooms on the Summerdale campus. That same year 1869-vintage Henszey's Bridge, a  wrought-iron bowstring arch/truss type, was refurbished and relocated to Central Penn from its previous home in Wanamakers, Pennsylvania. In 2004 the college's first satellite location opened on Old Philadelphia Pike in Lancaster. Responding to feedback from students for more recreational facilities, the college in 2014 opened The Underground, which contains a student union space, dance studio, fitness center, writing center and the Capital BlueCross Theatre. Fall 2015 saw the opening of the Donald B. and Dorothy L. Stabler Health Sciences Building, a state-of-the-industry facility designed to give students in the Department of Health Sciences a real-world, hands-on experience.

Locations

Central Penn College Summerdale (Harrisburg) campus
The main campus of Central Penn College is located in Summerdale, Pennsylvania. The campus comprises four academic buildings, the Charles "T" Jones Leadership Library, thirty-four student townhouses, six apartment buildings, a new Health Sciences Building, the Underground Student Union, and the Boyer House. The main campus is home to large yearly events including the college's annual Fall Harvest (homecoming) event, as well as Festival of Nations and SummerFest.

Central Penn College Lancaster location
In 2004, Central Penn College opened its first additional location: the Lancaster Center. The center serves mainly adult students enrolled in a variety of degree programs, including:

Physical Therapist Assistant
Business Administration
Accounting
Criminal Justice

Central Penn College's Lancaster Center offers primarily evening classes, Monday – Thursday. Most courses are taught in a blended format––a mix of in-person and online learning, The center operates by the same academic schedule as the Summerdale main campus––four, 11-week terms. This year-round, accelerated approach enables students––if they maintain a full schedule––to complete their academic program earlier.

Central Penn College Lehigh Valley location
In May 2009, Central Penn College operated a location in the Lehigh Valley at the Lehigh Calley Corporate Center in Bethlehem, PA. The location operated until the winter of 2015 at which time it ceased operations.

Athletics

The Central Penn College Knights are in the United States Collegiate Athletic Association (USCAA) Division 2. The USCAA is a national organization that exists to provide quality athletic competition on a regional and national level for smaller institutions of higher learning and their student-athletes. The association conducts national championships, names All-Americans and scholar-athletes. Athletics are being streamed by Knightly News Media, which began in 2018 includes men's and women's basketball.

Men's Sports

Baseball
Basketball
Soccer

Women's Sports

Basketball
Volleyball
Soccer

References

External links
Official website
Official athletics webpage

 
Educational institutions established in 1881
Universities and colleges in Cumberland County, Pennsylvania
USCAA member institutions
1881 establishments in Pennsylvania
Private universities and colleges in Pennsylvania